PLplot is a library of subroutines that are often used to make scientific plots in compiled languages such as C, C++, D, Fortran, Ada, OCaml and Java. The library also exists as an unofficial binding for the .NET runtime. PLplot can also be used interactively by interpreted languages such as Octave, Python, Perl and Tcl. The current version was written primarily by Maurice J. LeBrun and Geoffrey Furnish.

License 
PLplot is free software and is licensed under the LGPL.

See also 

 Matplotlib 
 Gnuplot
 Pyxplot
 Grace
 DISLIN
 PGPLOT

References

External links 
 PLplot homepage
 PLplot Wiki

Free plotting software
Free software programmed in C